Nenad Prodanović (born 28 November 1954) is a Bosnian bobsledder. He competed in the four man event at the 1984 Winter Olympics, representing Yugoslavia.

References

1954 births
Living people
Yugoslav male bobsledders
Bosnia and Herzegovina male bobsledders
Olympic bobsledders of Yugoslavia
Bobsledders at the 1984 Winter Olympics
Sportspeople from Sarajevo